John P. McCarthy (March 17, 1884 – September 4, 1962), also known as J.P. McCarthy or simply as John McCarthy, was an American director and screenwriter of the 1920s through 1945. He began in the film industry in front of the camera, as an actor in silent films and film shorts during the 1910s, before moving behind the camera in 1920. He usually directed his own screenplays. Although he directed the occasional drama or comedy, his specialty was the Western, which make up 28 of his 38 filmography entries.

Life and career
John P. McCarthy was born on Saint Patrick's Day 1884 in San Francisco, California to John Henry and Catherine Lynch McCarty. He later changed his last name from "McCarty" to "McCarthy".

He developed an early radiotelephone system, but was unsuccessful in marketing his invention. McCarthy entered the film industry in 1914. His first part was a small role in the film short The Wireless Voice, which also featured his radio equipment. Over the next four years he appeared in eight films, all but one a short. His one feature was in a small part of a prison guard in the 1916 D. W. Griffith classic, Intolerance.

McCarthy moved behind the camera in 1920, writing, producing and directing Out of the Dust, starring Russell Simpson. He wrote eighteen scripts during his 25-year career, all but four of which he directed himself. McCarthy directed a total of 38 films, 12 of which were silent. His notable silent films include The Lovelorn (1927), and Diamond Handcuffs (1928). Some of his notable sound films include: Oklahoma Cyclone (1930), one of the first "singing cowboy films; The Law of 45's, the forerunner to the Republic Pictures western series The Three Mesquiteers; and 1936's Song of the Gringo, the film debut of Tex Ritter.

His most prolific year was 1931, when he directed eight films, two of which he also wrote: Cavalier of the West and God's Country and the Man. He took a hiatus from the film industry in the early 1940s, before returning in 1944. His final directorial credit was part of The Cisco Kid series, 1945's The Cisco Kid Returns. In 1946 McCarthy wrote the story for the Western, Under Arizona Skies, directed by Lambert Hillyer, which was his final film credit.

Filmography

(Per AFI database)

 The Wireless Voice (1914 – Short) as J.P. McCarthy – actor
 Who Shot Bud Walton? (1914 – Short) as J.P. McCarthy – actor
 The Availing Prayer (1914 – Short) as J.P. McCarthy – actor
 For His Pal (1915 – Short) as J.P. McCarthy – actor
 The Little Orphans (1915 – Short) as J.P. McCarthy – actor
 Jerry's Double Header (1916 – Short) – actor
 Intolerance  (1916) as J.P. McCarthy – actor
 The Flying Target (1917 – Short) as J.P. McCarthy – actor
 Out of the Dust  (1920) – writer, director, producer
 Shadows of Conscience (1921) – writer, director
 Brand of Cowardice (1925) – writer, director
 Hurricane Hal (1925) – writer
 Pals (1925) – director
 The Border Whirlwind  (1926) – director
 Vanishing Hoofs  (1926) – director
 His Foreign Wife (1927) – writer, director
 Becky  (1927) – director
 The Devil's Masterpiece  (1927) – director
 The Lovelorn  (1927) – director
 Diamond Handcuffs  (1928) – director
 The Eternal Woman (1929) – director
 Headin' North (1930) as J. P. McCarthy – writer, director
 The Land of Missing Men  (1930) as J. P. McCarthy – writer, director
 Oklahoma Cyclone  (1930) as J. P. McCarthy – writer, director
 Cavalier of the West  (1931) – writer, director
 Mother and Son  (1931) – director
 Sunrise Trail  (1931) credited as J. P. McCarthy – director
 God's Country and the Man  (1931) as J. P. McCarthy – writer, director
 Nevada Buckaroo  (1931) – director
 Rider of the Plains (1931) as J. P. McCarthy – director
 Ships of Hate (1931) as J. P. McCarthy – director
 The Ridin' Fool  (1931) as J. P. McCarthy – director
 Beyond the Rockies (1932) – writer
 The Forty-Niners  (1932) – director
 The Western Code  (1932) as J. P. McCarthy – director
 Lucky Larrigan  (1932) – writer, director
 The Fighting Champ  (1932) – director
 The Return of Casey Jones  (1933) as J. P. McCarthy – writer, director
 The Gallant Fool (1933) – writer
 Crashin' Broadway  (1933) – director
 Trailing North  (1933) – director
 The Law of 45's  (1935) – director
 Lawless Border  (1935) as J. P. McCarthy – director
 Song of the Gringo  (1936) as John McCarthy – writer, director
 The Lion Man  (1936) as John McCarthy – director
 Conspiracy (1939) as John McCarthy – writer
 Marked Trails  (1944) as J. P. McCarthy – writer, director
 Raiders of the Border  (1944) – director
 The Cisco Kid Returns  (1945) – director
 Under Arizona Skies (1946) – writer

References

External links

 

1884 births
1962 deaths
20th-century American male actors
20th-century American male writers
20th-century American screenwriters
American male screenwriters
American male silent film actors
Film directors from San Francisco
Radio pioneers
Screenwriters from California
Western (genre) film directors
Writers from San Francisco